Iraa Agarwal is an Indian model, actress and boxer who works in Tamil-language television shows and films.

Career 
In 2015, she won the Miss South India beauty pageant. In 2017, she made her film debut with the thriller film Dhayam.  in 2018, she starred in Kattu Paya Sir Intha Kaali. In 2019, she replaced  Shivani Narayanan in the television show Kadaikutty Singam. Later that same year, she portrayed one of the leads in the soap opera Rajamagal on Zee Tamil. Outside of acting, she won a gold medal for boxing at the United International Games 2019.

Filmography 
All films are in Tamil, unless otherwise noted.

Television

References

External links 

Tamil television actresses
Actresses from Tamil Nadu
Actresses in Tamil television
Actresses in Tamil cinema
Indian television actresses
Indian film actresses
21st-century Indian actresses
Indian female models
Living people

Year of birth missing (living people)